Poker Squares (also known as, Poker Solitaire, or Poker Patience) is a patience game with the objective of building the best poker hands using just 25 cards from the deck. It rewards both lucky guessing and accurate calculation of odds.

Rules
The game starts with placing a card onto a space in a 5x5 grid. Cards are placed one at a time and once a card is placed on the grid, it can no longer be moved.

Once all 25 cards are dealt, points are scored on hands of 5 cards formed horizontally in rows or vertically in columns. The number of points depend on the hierarchy of poker hands. 

There are two systems of scoring: The English and the American point systems. The English system reflects the difficulty of getting the hands in the game; the American system reflects the difficulty of getting the hands in actual poker. The two systems rate the hands' scores as follows:

The points scored from each hand are added to the total score. Albert H. Morehead and Geoffrey Mott-Smith suggest that to win one must score at least 200 points in the American system or 70 in the English system.   Because of the application of the point system, this solitaire is more prevalent as a computer game.

Variants
In the variation Poker Shuffle (also called Switch-a-roo Poker Solitaire or Open Poker Squares), cards played onto the grid can be moved until all 25 cards are set.  Players can even choose to deal all 25 cards face-up before beginning placement.  This gives more flexibility, and gives players the opportunity to produce higher scoring hands on the grid.  Scoring is the same as Poker Squares, but under these rules a winning score is 120 points in the English system and 310 points in the American system.

A two player variant can implemented by taking turns to play and comparing scores.

See also
 List of solitaire games
 Glossary of solitaire terms

References

Planners (games)
Single-deck patience card games